The Light Flyweight class in the boxing at the 2008 Summer Olympics competition is the lightest class.  Light flyweights were limited to those boxers weighing less than 48 kilograms (105.8 lbs).

29 boxers qualified for this category after the 2007 World Amateur Boxing Championships and 9 Continental Qualification Tournaments.

The only Olympic medalist to participate in the flyweight at the Beijing Games is the host country boxer, Zou Shiming, bronze at the 2004 Games and defending World Champion.

Like all Olympic boxing events, the competition was a straight single-elimination tournament. Both semifinal losers were awarded bronze medals, so no boxers competed again after their first loss. Bouts consisted of four rounds of two minutes each, with one-minute breaks between rounds. Punches scored only if the white area on the front of the glove made full contact with the front of the head or torso of the opponent. Five judges scored each bout; three of the judges had to signal a scoring punch within one second for the punch to score. The winner of the bout was the boxer who scored the most valid punches by the end of the bout.

Medalists

Qualified Athletes

Schedule
All times are China Standard Time (UTC+8)

Draw

See also
2009 World Amateur Boxing Championships – Light flyweight

External links
AIBA
Results

Boxing at the 2008 Summer Olympics